Dominique Lemoine (born 12 March 1966) is a retired international Belgian footballer.

References
 
 Profile

External links
 

1966 births
Living people
Belgian footballers
Belgium international footballers
K.S.K. Beveren players
Ligue 1 players
Ligue 2 players
FC Mulhouse players
Royal Excel Mouscron players
RCD Espanyol footballers
La Liga players
Standard Liège players
R.A.E.C. Mons players
Valenciennes FC players
Belgian Pro League players
Belgian expatriate footballers
Belgian expatriate sportspeople in Spain
Expatriate footballers in Spain
Expatriate footballers in France
Association football midfielders
Belgian expatriate sportspeople in France